Raheem L. Mullins (born March 10, 1978) is an American lawyer and judge who has served as an Associate Justice of the Connecticut Supreme Court since 2017.

Biography

Mullins graduated from Watkinson School in Hartford in 1996 then went on to receive his Bachelor of Arts degree in Sociology from Clark University in Worcester, Massachusetts, in 2001 and his Juris Doctor from Northeastern University School of Law in 2004.

After completing law school, he worked as a law clerk for the Honorable Frederick L. Brown of the Massachusetts Appeals Court from 2004 to 2005.  Prior to his appointment, Mullins was a prosecutor for the Appellate Bureau, Division of Criminal Justice, in Rocky Hill, Connecticut and an assistant attorney general in the Child Protection Division in Hartford.

He was nominated by Governor Dannel Malloy in 2012 to serve as a judge of the Middlesex County Superior Court. He was then appointed to be a judge on the state Court of Appeals in 2014.

Judicial career

Connecticut Superior Court service
On January 19, 2012 Mullins was nominated to the Superior Court. Upon his appointment to the Superior Court, his nomination faced criticism because at the time, at 33, he was the second-youngest person ever to be nominated for a state judgeship. He was confirmed in February 2012.

Connecticut Appellate Court service

On March 14, 2014 Mullins nominated to the Connecticut Appellate Court to seat vacated by Stuart D. Bear who faced mandatory retirement. He was confirmed by the Connecticut General Assembly on April 25, 2014. He assumed office on May 6, 2014.

Connecticut Supreme Court service

On October 4, 2017 Mullins was one of two nominations made to the Connecticut Supreme Court. He was confirmed and sworn into office on November 1, 2017.

On May 26, 2022, it was reported that Raheem L. Mullins and two Yale Law School professors, Cristina M. Rodríguez and Justin Driver were possibly being vetting for a vacancy on the United States Court of Appeals for the Second Circuit.

References

External links
Honorable Raheem L. Mullins Official Court Biography

1978 births
Living people
African-American judges
African-American lawyers
Clark University alumni
Justices of the Connecticut Supreme Court
Judges of the Connecticut Appellate Court
Northeastern University School of Law alumni
Superior court judges in the United States
21st-century American judges
21st-century African-American people
20th-century African-American people